The following is a list of films produced in the Kannada film industry in India in 2002, presented in alphabetical order.

List of Released films

References

2002 Year Round Up

External links
 Kannada Movies of 2002 at the Internet Movie Database

2002
Kannada
Kannada films